The 1983–84 Southern Football League season was the 81st in the history of the league, an English football competition.

Dartford won the Premier Division, winning their fourth Southern League title and were promoted to the Alliance Premier League, while Shepshed Charterhouse, Willenhall Town and Road-Sea Southampton were promoted to the Premier Division for the first time in their history along with Crawley Town, who returned after 15 seasons.

Premier Division
The Premier Division consisted of 20 clubs, including 15 clubs from the previous season and five new clubs:
Two clubs promoted from the Midland Division:
Cheltenham Town
Sutton Coldfield Town

Two clubs promoted from the Southern Division:
Fisher Athletic
Folkestone

Plus:
King's Lynn, transferred from the Northern Premier League

League table

Midland Division
The Midland Division expanded up to 20 clubs, including 12 clubs from the previous season and eight new clubs:
Two clubs joined from the Midland Football Combination:
Bridgnorth Town
Moor Green

Two clubs joined from the West Midlands (Regional) League:
Coventry Sporting
VS Rugby

Plus:
Enderby Town, relegated from the Premier Division and changed name to Leicester United
Rushden Town, promoted from the United Counties League
Shepshed Charterhouse, promoted from the Northern Counties East League
Tamworth, relegated from the Northern Premier League

League table

Southern Division
The Midland Division expanded up to 20 clubs, including 15 clubs from the previous season and five new clubs:
Three clubs relegated from the Premier Division:
Addlestone & Weybridge Town
Poole Town
Waterlooville

Plus:
Chatham Town, joined from the Kent Football League
Dover Athletic, new club formed after Dover folded

At the end of the season Hillingdon Borough was renamed Hillingdon.

League table

See also
 Southern Football League
 1983–84 Isthmian League
 1983–84 Northern Premier League

References
RSSF – Southern Football League archive

Southern Football League seasons
6